Banjari is a village in Katni district of Madhya Pradesh state of India. It is the site where the Katni River merges into the Mahanadi river. Banjari is located just south of Vijayraghavgarh.

See also 
 Katni district
 Vijayraghavgarh
 Katni River

References 

Villages in Katni district